USS LST-992 was an  in the United States Navy. Like many of her class, she was not named and is properly referred to by her hull designation.

LST-992 was laid down on 5 March 1944 at the Boston Navy Yard; launched on 7 April 1944; sponsored by Mrs. Frances C. Landers; and commissioned on 10 May 1944.

Service history
During World War II, LST-992 was assigned to the Asiatic-Pacific theater and participated in the assault and occupation of Okinawa Gunto in June 1945. Following the war, she performed occupation duty in the Far East and saw service in China until early April 1946. She returned to the United States and was decommissioned on 9 August 1946 and struck from the Navy list on 25 September that same year. On 13 June 1948, the ship was sold to the Walter W. Johnson Co. for scrapping.

LST-992 earned one battle star for World War II service.

References

 

LST-542-class tank landing ships
World War II amphibious warfare vessels of the United States
Ships built in Boston
1944 ships